The 1977 Tour de Romandie was the 31st edition of the Tour de Romandie cycle race and was held from 10 May to 15 May 1977. The race started in Fribourg and finished in Geneva. The race was won by Gianbattista Baronchelli.

General classification

References

1977
Tour de Romandie
Tour de Romandie
1977 Super Prestige Pernod